Poundbakery is a bakery chain in the United Kingdom, which specializes in savory products such as pies, pasties, sausage rolls, sandwich, and sweet products including doughnuts and muffins. It was established in Bolton, England by Sayers in 2010.

References

Bakeries of the United Kingdom
Food manufacturers of England
Companies based in Bolton